Wildcat Falls is located at  in the western quarter of Yosemite National Park alongside Highway 140, approximately 2.8 miles inside the park from the Arch Rock Entrance. It consists of a relatively thin string of falls and cascades totaling 720 feet (some sources list 630 feet), and only flows until about May or June. There are a total of seven drops in the waterfall, the longest being 120 feet. The base of the waterfall is a mossy grotto that is easily reached on foot and is a popular location among photographers.

Waterfalls of Yosemite National Park
Waterfalls of Mariposa County, California